Otto Gunnar Danielsen (4 February 1911 – 13 March 1958) was a Danish sailor. He competed in the 8 Metre event at the 1936 Summer Olympics.

References

External links
 

1911 births
1958 deaths
Danish male sailors (sport)
Olympic sailors of Denmark
Sailors at the 1936 Summer Olympics – 8 Metre
Sportspeople from Copenhagen